Boyd Irwin (12 March 1880 – 22 January 1957) was an English stage and film actor. He appeared in more than 130 films between 1915 and 1948, both silent and "talkies", including a starring role in Australian film For Australia in 1915. He was born in Brighton, Sussex and died in Los Angeles, California.

Selected filmography

 The Luck of Geraldine Laird (1920)
 Milestones (1920)
 Eyes of the Eagle (1920) 
 A Lady in Love (1920)
 A Gilded Dream (1920)
 The Fatal Sign (1920)
 The Three Musketeers (1921)
 The Long Chance (1922)
 Around the World in Eighteen Days (1923)
 Ashes of Vengeance (1923)
 Enemies of Children (1923)
 Captain Blood (1924)
 Madam Satan (1930) - as the skipper of a dirigible
 The Common Law (1931)
 Dr. Jekyll and Mr. Hyde (1931) - as the head of Scotland Yard
 Cardinal Richelieu (1935)
 The Widow from Monte Carlo (1935)
 Accent on Youth (1935)
 Devil's Squadron (1936) - as head of the airport
 Give Me Liberty (1936)
 Killer at Large (1936)
 The Man in the Iron Mask (1939)
 The Witness Vanishes  (1939)
 The Invisible Killer (1939)
 Sky Patrol (1939)
 Drums of the Desert (1940)
 Passage from Hong Kong (1941)
 The Great Swindle (1941)
 Foreign Agent (1942)
 The Major and the Minor (1942)
 King of the Bandits (1947)
 Docks of New Orleans (1948)

References

External links

1880 births
1957 deaths
English male film actors
English male silent film actors
20th-century English male actors
British expatriate male actors in the United States